Lee Chang-ho (Hangul: 이창호, Hanja: 李彰浩; born March 9, 1987, in Uiwang) is a South Korean relief pitcher who plays for the LG Twins in the Korea Baseball Organization. He bats and throws right-handed.

External links 
 Career statistics and player information from Korea Baseball Organization

1987 births
Living people
South Korean baseball players
LG Twins players
NC Dinos players
Dankook University alumni
People from Uiwang
Sportspeople from Gyeonggi Province